Mark Schultz may refer to:
Mark Schultz (comics) (born 1955), American comic book creator and illustrator
Mark Schultz (musician) (born 1970), Christian singer-songwriter
 Mark Schultz (album)
Mark Schultz (wrestler) (born 1960), 1984 Olympic gold medalist

See also
 Martin Schultz (disambiguation)
 Markus Schulz (born 1975), German-American DJ and music producer
 Marvin Schulz (born 1995), German footballer